Xenopathia nivea is a moth in the family Blastobasidae. It is found in Transcaspia.

References

Natural History Museum Lepidoptera generic names catalog

Blastobasidae